The Aladağlar National Park, established on April 21, 1995, is in southern Turkey. Its name, meaning Crimson Mountains, is said to have been given to it because of the rusty colour the mountains acquire towards sunset.

The Aladağlar contains four climbable peaks that are higher than 3700m. The highest peak is Kızılkaya with a height of 3767m.

Many lakes and waterfalls form here once the snow melts in early spring.

References

National parks of Turkey
Mountain ranges of Turkey
Geography of Kayseri Province
Geography of Niğde Province
Geography of Adana Province
Landforms of Kayseri Province
Landforms of Niğde Province
Landforms of Adana Province
Tourist attractions in Kayseri Province
Tourist attractions in Niğde Province
Tourist attractions in Adana Province
Yahyalı District
Çamardı District
Aladağ, Adana
1995 establishments in Turkey
Protected areas established in 1995
Important Bird Areas of Turkey